Black Butler is an anime series adapted from the manga series of the same title by Yana Toboso. Directed by Toshiya Shinohara and produced by A-1 Pictures, Black Butler follows the adventures of Sebastian Michaelis, a demon butler who is obligated to serve Ciel Phantomhive, the young head of the Phantomhive noble family, due to a contract he made.

The anime adaptation was confirmed on July 11, 2008 by Gakken's Animedia magazine, and the official website of the anime began to stream a trailer of the anime on July 26, 2008. The series premiered on October 3, 2008, on Mainichi Broadcasting System and Chubu-Nippon Broadcasting. Two DVD compilations were released by Aniplex; the first compilation on January 21, 2009 and the second on February 25, 2009.

After the sixth episode, the anime begins to diverge from the storyline of the manga. The second season, which premiered on July 2, 2010, and concluded on September 17, 2010, continues this original storyline. The third season, Book of Circus (黒執事・サーカスの書, Kuroshitsuji: Sākasu no Sho), premiered on July 10, 2014, and concluded on September 12, 2014. Serving as a soft reboot of the anime, the series adapts the "Noah Ark Circus" arc from the manga while ignoring the anime-exclusive events of the previous two seasons. The series was followed by a two-episode OVA, Black Butler: Book of Murder, 
which adapts the "Phantomhive Manor Murders" arc. The first OVA was released in Japanese cinemas on October 25, and the second on November 15, 2014.

Three pieces of theme music are used for the first season. The opening theme is "Monochrome no Kiss" (though written as Monochrome Kiss) by the Japanese rock band Sid, while the first ending theme is "I'm Alive!" by the American singer Rebecca Hollcraft, commonly known as Becca. The second ending, which began airing with episode 14, is "Lacrimosa" by Kalafina. Two singles containing the theme music and other tracks have been released; the single containing tracks from Sid was released on October 29, 2008 and the single from Becca was released on October 22, 2008. The third single containing tracks from Kalafina has a release date of March 4, 2009.

For the second season, the opening song is "Shiver" by The Gazette and the ending song "Bird" is sung by Yuya Matsushita, and the single was released in August 2010. The ending for episode 8 is "Kagayaku Sora no Shijima ni wa" by Kalafina. The opening song for the third season is "ENAMEL" by Sid, while the ending song is "Aoki Tsuki Michite" by AKIRA.

Aniplex later released the complete Blu-ray and DVD on May 7, 2014.

Episode list

Season 1

Season 2

Book of Circus, Book of Murder and Book of the Atlantic

Notes

References
General

Specific

External links
Official website 
 Black Butler at the Internet Movie Database
 Black Butler II at the Internet Movie Database
 Black Butler: Book of Circus at the Internet Movie Database

Black Butler
Black Butler